Members of the Herreshoff family of Bristol, Rhode Island, were, among other things, notable naval architects, naval industrialists, industrial chemists, and automobile designers and manufacturers.

Selected members 

Charles Frederick Herreshoff (1809–1888) – on April 15, 1833, in Boston – married Julia Ann Lewis (1811–1901). Charles graduated from Brown University in 1828.

 
         <li> Charles Frederick Herreshoff (1880–1954)

 

 
         <li> Algernon Sidney DeWolf Herreshoff (1886–1977), MIT class of 1911, naval architect
         <li> Halsey Chase Herreshoff (born 1933)
   <li> Lewis Francis Herreshoff (1890–1972), American boat designer, marine engineer
   <li> Nathanael Greene Herreshoff II
            <li> Nathanael Greene Herreshoff III

 
         <li> Louise Chamberlain Herreshoff (1876–1967), artist
   <li> Sarah Lothrop Herreshoff (1889–1958)
            <li> Guido Borgianni (it) (1914–2011), Sarah's son, Italian artist, identified as having been part of the Macchiaioli movement

Family tree; selected members

Other children of C.F. Herreshoff III and Julia Ann Lewis 
 ❸ Charles Frederick Herreshoff (1839–1917)
 ❺ Lewis Herreshoff (1844–1926)
 ❻ Sally Brown Herreshoff (1845–1917)

Blindness among siblings 
Of the seven sons and two daughters of C.F. Herreshoff and Julia Ann Lewis, four were blind:

Gallery

Extended family and distant ancestors 
Charles Frederick Herreshoff III (1809–1888), by way of his mother, Sarah Brown (1773–1846), was a grandson of John Brown (1736–1803), merchant, enslaver, and statesman from Providence, who, with his brothers – Nicholas (1729–1791), Joseph (1733–1785), and Moses (1738–1836), an abolitionist – was instrumental in (i) founding Brown University and (ii) moving it to their family's former land in Providence. Julia Ann Lewis (1811–1901), by way of her father, Joseph Warren Lewis (1774–1844), was a granddaughter of Winslow Lewis (1770–1850) of Wellfleet, Massachusetts, a sea captain, engineer, inventor, and contractor active in the construction of many American lighthouses during the first half of the nineteenth century. Julian Ann Lewis is also a niece of Isaiah William Penn Lewis (1808–1955) (Winslow Lewis' nephew), who was also a  lighthouse designer, builder, and engineer.

By way of his mother, Sarah Brown (1773–1846), C.F Herreshoff III was a 4th great-grandson of Rev. Chad Brown, the progenitor of the Brown family of Rhode Island.

Nowadays, tens of millions of Americans have at least one ancestor who was in Rhode Island around 1600. But, with respect to males descending from Chad Brown, according to Galton-Watson probability, only a fraction of that number have an unbroken chain of paternal lineage maintaining the Brown surname from his line.

See also 
 Herreshoff Marine Museum
 Herreshoff (automobile)

Bibliography

Notes

References
News media

 

.
.

 LCCN . .

 

Books, journals, magazines, and papers

 (all 6 Vols. accessible via HathiTrust → link)
<li> Volume 1
<li> Volume 2
<li> Volume 3
<li> Volume 4: Biographical ← "Herreshoff"
<li> Volume 5: Biographical
<li> Volume 6: Biographical

 

 ( via Library of Congress).

 

 

 

 (The North American Review is also accissable via the HathiTrust Digital Library).

 (The North American Review is also accessible via the HathiTrust Digital Library).

 

 
Entries (no page numbers):
<li> "Herreshoff, Charles Frederick" (1809–1888)
<li> "Herreshoff, James Brown" (1834–) (photo)
<li> "Herreshoff, John Brown" (1841–)
<li> "Herreshoff, John Brown Francis" (1850–)
<li> "Herreshoff, Julian Lewis" (1854–)
<li> "Herreshoff, Nathaniel Greene" (1848–)

 .

 

 . .